William Henry Moorhead  (1882–1962) was the fourth Bishop of Fredericton.

He was born in Longford in Ireland, educated at Bishops University and  ordained in 1912. He was a curate at St Peter, Sherbrooke then a chaplain to the CEF until 1919. He then held incumbencies at St Luke's, Grand-Mère, Quebec and St Paul, Saint John, New Brunswick until 1936 when he became Dean of Christ Church Cathedral, Fredericton.

Three years later he ascended to the episcopate, retiring in 1956.

Notes

1882 births
People from County Longford
Bishop's University alumni
Deans of Fredericton
Anglican bishops of Fredericton
20th-century Anglican Church of Canada bishops
1962 deaths
Canadian military chaplains
World War I chaplains